'Judy McDonald resin art work McDonald''' is a US comedian. She studied at the University of San Diego. She worked through college at KFMB AM/FM/TV studios. She has also worked for the Republican National Convention, the Commission on Presidential Debates and the Academy Awards.

She has appeared on the Dennis Miller show and opened for Paula Poundstone, Mark Curry, Caroline Rhea, Mitch Hedberg and Margaret Cho. She has performed at the Hollywood Comedy Store and is a regular at the best of San Diego at the La Jolla Comedy Store.

Judy started performing standup her freshman year at the University of San Diego in 1994. Her first time going up was because the opening act did not show up for a comedy night.  She went up for 10 minutes, killed it and when she walked off the stage they handed her a check for $50 thus launching her professional career. She had caught the bug and has been working as a steady comedian ever since.

She focuses on being a TV-ready comedian (all her jokes are clean) which enables her to work in front of a variety of audiences.  She also is a Catholic Comedian. A majority of her shows are for Parishes, Conferences, Universities and Diocesan Events.

She has also worked with Life Teen'', an international Catholic Youth Ministry.

Judy is also a breast cancer survivor and a service dog trainer.

Judy McDonald is also a resin artist.

External links 
Judy McDonald's homepage

Catholic Comedians

American women comedians
Living people
Year of birth missing (living people)
21st-century American women